Licania salicifolia is a species of plant in the family Chrysobalanaceae. It is endemic to Colombia.

References

salicifolia
Endemic flora of Colombia
Endangered plants
Taxonomy articles created by Polbot
Taxobox binomials not recognized by IUCN